Mohanur railway station (Code: MONR) is a railway station situated in Mohanur, Namakkal district in the Indian state of Tamil Nadu. The station is an intermediate station on the newly commissioned – line which became operational in  May 2013. The station is operated by the Southern Railway zone of the Indian Railways and comes under the Salem railway division.

Trains
Chennai Central–Palakkad Junction (Palani Express)

Salem Junction–Karur Junction passenger.

Salem Junction–Tiruchirappalli Junction Passenger.

Bus facilities
Bus facility has been arranged by TNSTC-SLM from bus stand to railway station and railway station to bus stand during the arrival of Palakkad Express.

References

Salem railway division
Railway stations in Namakkal district